Pedro Frias (born 23 December 1964) is a Dominican Republic former boxer. He competed in the men's welterweight event at the 1988 Summer Olympics. Frias is legally blind in one eye.

References

External links
 

1964 births
Living people
Dominican Republic male boxers
Olympic boxers of the Dominican Republic
Boxers at the 1988 Summer Olympics
Place of birth missing (living people)
Welterweight boxers
Pan American Games medalists in boxing
Medalists at the 1987 Pan American Games
Pan American Games bronze medalists for the Dominican Republic
Boxers at the 1987 Pan American Games
20th-century Dominican Republic people